The 2009 Yunnan earthquake occurred with a moment magnitude of 5.7 in Yao'an County, Yunnan province, People's Republic of China on 9 July. At least one person died and over 300 were injured, with over 50 of these sustaining serious injuries.

Background and tectonics 

At 11:19 UTC (19:19 local time), a magnitude 5.7 earthquake with an epicentre at  occurred. Eight aftershocks were recorded. A magnitude 5.0 aftershock occurred on July 10 at 09:02:04 UTC (17:02:04 local time). In total, there were over 8 aftershocks.

Damage and casualties 
The earthquake destroyed 10,000 houses and damaged a further 30,000. One person died and over 300 people were injured, with over 50 suffering serious injuries.  Yunnan province's civil affairs department was dispatching 4,500 tents, and 3,000 quilts as part of the disaster relief efforts. Also, a coal mine collapsed in the epicentral area within 50 miles.

See also
List of earthquakes in 2009
List of earthquakes in China

References

External links

2009 Yunnan
2009 earthquakes
2009 disasters in China
Geography of Chuxiong Yi Autonomous Prefecture
Yao'an County